WLSH (1410 AM) is a radio station broadcasting an adult standards music format. Licensed to Lansford, Pennsylvania, the station is owned by CC Broadcasting, LLC and features programming from USA Radio Network and Westwood One.  WLSH has a daytime power of 5,000 watts, serving portions of seven counties in East Central Pennsylvania including significant portions of the Allentown / Bethlehem market and the Wilkes-Barre / Scranton market. WLSH signed-on December 24, 1952.

Previous logo

References

External links

LSH
Carbon County, Pennsylvania
Radio stations established in 1952
1952 establishments in Pennsylvania
LSH